is the largest freshwater lake in Japan. It is located entirely within Shiga Prefecture (west-central Honshu), northeast of the former capital city of Kyoto. Lake Biwa is an ancient lake, over 4 million years old. It is estimated to be the 13th oldest lake in the world. Because of its proximity to Kyoto, references to Lake Biwa appear frequently in Japanese literature, particularly in poetry and in historical accounts of battles.

Name
The name Biwako was established in the Edo period. There are various theories about the origin of the name Biwako, but it is generally believed to be so named because of the resemblance of its shape to that of a stringed instrument called the biwa. Kōsō, a learned monk of Enryaku-ji in the 14th century, gave a clue to the origin of the name Biwako in his writing: "The lake is the Pure land of the goddess Benzaiten because she lives on Chikubu Island and the shape of the lake is similar to that of the biwa, her favorite instrument."

Later the pronunciation Awaumi changed to the modern Ōmi as in the name of Ōmi Province. The lake is also called  in literature.

Area and use
The area of this lake is about 670 km² (258.69 sq mi). Small rivers drain from the surrounding mountains into Lake Biwa, and its main outlet is the Seta River, which later becomes the Uji River, combining with the Katsura and Kizu to become the Yodo River and flows into the Seto Inland Sea at Osaka Bay.

It serves as a reservoir for the cities of Kyoto and Ōtsu and is a valuable resource for nearby textile industries. It provides drinking water for about 15 million people in the Kansai region. Lake Biwa is a breeding ground for freshwater fish, including trout, and for the pearl culture industry.

The Lake Biwa Canal, built in the late 1890s and later expanded during the Taishō period played a role of great importance in the rekindling of Kyoto's industrial life, after a steep decline following the transfer of the capital to Tokyo.

Lake Biwa is home to many popular beaches along the north-western shore, in particular, for example, Shiga Beach and Omi-Maiko. The Mizunomori Water Botanical Garden and The Lake Biwa Museum in Kusatsu are also of interest.

The Lake Biwa Marathon takes place in Ōtsu, the city at the southern end of the lake, annually since 1962.

Natural history

Lake Biwa is of tectonic origin and is one of the world's oldest lakes, dating to at least 4 million years ago. This long uninterrupted age has allowed for a notably diverse ecosystem to evolve in the lake.  Naturalists have documented more than 1000 species and subspecies in the lake, including about 60 endemics. Lake Biwa is an important place for water birds. About 5,000 water birds visit Lake Biwa every year.

There are 46 native fish species and subspecies in the lake, including 11 species and 5 subspecies that are endemic or near-endemic. The endemic species are five cyprinids (Carassius cuvieri, Gnathopogon caerulescens, Ischikauia steenackeri, Opsariichthys uncirostris and Sarcocheilichthys biwaensis), a true loach (Cobitis magnostriata), two gobies (Gymnogobius isaza and Rhinogobius biwaensis), two silurid catfish (Silurus biwaensis and S. lithophilus) and a cottid (Cottus reinii). The Biwa trout is also endemic to the lake, but some maintain that it is a subspecies of the widespread masu salmon rather than a separate species. The remaining endemic fish are subspecies of Carassius auratus, Cobitis minamorii, Sarcocheilichthys variegatus and Squalidus (chankaensis) biwae.

Lake Biwa is also the home of a large number of molluscs, including 38 freshwater snails (19 endemic) and 16 bivalves (9 endemic).

Recently the biodiversity of the lake has suffered greatly due to the invasion of foreign fish, the black bass and the bluegill.  Bluegill were presented to the Emperor and later freed in the lake as a food source for other fish.  Black bass were introduced as a sport fish.  In July 2009, a largemouth bass weighing 10.12 kg (22 pounds, 4 ounces) was caught from the lake by Manabu Kurita. It has been officially certified by the International Game Fish Association (IGFA) to tie the largemouth bass world record held solely by George Perry for 77 years.

Archaeology
The Awazu site, a submerged Shell midden, is an important archaeological site of the Jōmon period. It goes back to the beginning of the Initial Jōmon period (ca. 9300 BP). It lies near the southern end of Lake Biwa, close to Otsu City, at a depth of 2 to 3 meters from the bottom.

The site shows the use of plant and animal food resources by the Jōmon people. It also demonstrates the importance of nut consumption in this period.

Shell Midden No. 3 is dated to the Middle Jōmon period. An abundance of horse chestnuts were uncovered here (about 40% of their total estimated diet). This indicates that, by this later period, a sophisticated processing technology was mastered in order to remove the harmful tannic acid, and make this food safe for consumption.

Ishiyama is another such site of the Early Jōmon period on Lake Biwa.

Environmental legislation
Various environmental laws cover Lake Biwa:

Eutrophication prevention
At the prefectural level, Eutrophication Control Ordinance was enacted in 1979. It was intended to control the use of synthetic detergents by companies and residents alike and followed a successful citizens' campaign known as the Soap Movement, which had emerged from women's consumer groups earlier in the 1970s. 

Legislation to prevent eutrophication was enacted in 1981 and first enforced on July 1, 1982; therefore, this day is called "". The legislation established standards for the nitrogen and phosphorus levels for agricultural, industrial, and household water sources emptying into the lake. They also banned people from using and selling synthetic detergents which contain phosphorus.

Wetlands protection
The lake was designated as a UNESCO Ramsar Wetland (1993) in accordance with the Ramsar Convention. The object of this treaty is to protect and sensibly use internationally valuable wetlands. The Kushiro marsh (釧路湿原, Kushiro Shitsugen) in Japan is under this treaty now.

Conservation of Reed Vegetation Zones
Reed colonies on the shore form give Lake Biwa its characteristic scenery. The reeds play an important role in purifying water as well as providing habitat for birds and fish. At one time there were large areas of reeds along the shores of Lake Biwa, which local government surveys recently found to have halved in size due to encroaching development. This Shiga Ordinance for the Conservation of Reed Vegetation Zones to protect, grow, and utilize the reed beds has been in force since 1992.

Gallery

See also
 Eight Views of Omi
 Biwako Line
 Biwako Quasi-National Park
 Birdman Rally (1977–), the yearly televised homemade glider and human-powered flight competition.
 Biwa town, a town on the northern shore of Lake Biwa and its name was named after Lake Biwa.
 F.C. Mi-O Biwako Kusatsu, a football club based in Kusatsu, Shiga, facing the lake.
 Tourism in Japan
 Lake Hamana, a lake in Shizuoka Prefecture, its old name was "distant fresh-water sea".
  Takeshima Island

Explanatory notes

References

External links

 Department of Lake Biwa and Environment, Shiga Prefecture
 Lake Biwa Environmental Research Institute
 Lake Biwa Museum
 Ramsar site database
 go.biwako - Travel Guide of Shiga Prefecture, Japan
 Lake Biwa (World Wildlife Fund)
 Review of Criodrilidae (Annelida: Oligochaeta) including Biwadrilus from Japan
 Live Webcam of Biwako
 Japan's Secret Garden NOVA / PBS
Fishing World Records

Ancient lakes
Biwa
Biwa
Biwa
Landforms of Shiga Prefecture
Jōmon period
Ōmihachiman, Shiga